This is a list of alumni and faculty of Jamia Millia Islamia.

Faculty

Alumni

References 

Jamia Milia Islamia